Per Saugman (26 June 1925 – 25 November 2005) was a Director of Blackwell Scientific Publications and a Fellow of St Cross College, Oxford.
After graduating from Gentofte State School, Per Saugman was apprenticed in Ejnar Munksgaard 's bookshop in 1941 and after completing his apprenticeship in 1945, he supplemented his education at scientific publishers and bookstores in Switzerland and England.
In 1950 he returned to Munksgaards Boglade og Forlag but already in 1952 he was attached to Blackwell Scientific Publications Ltd. in Oxford and Edinburgh as sales manager and the following year he was appointed head of the same, a post he held until 1987. After taking over the management of Blackwell Scientific Publications, Per Saugman managed to lead the initially modest publishing house to be one of the leading scientific publishers in the English-speaking world with branches in the USA and Australia. In 1963, on the initiative of Per Saugman, Blackwell Scientific took over the majority of shares in Ejnar Munksgaard's Forlag, and he thereby sat on Munksgaard's board of directors from 1964 until 1992, from 1967 as chairman of the board. As early as 1953, Per Saugman sat on the board of BH Blackwell Booksellers in Oxford;
Also in the international organizational work, use was made of his abilities as a negotiator and meeting leader. He was a member of the board of The Publishers Association of Great Britain, a member of the board of The International Group of Scientific Technical and Medical Publishers 1977-79. Per Saugman's career in the international publishing world must be characterized as something out of the ordinary. His efforts in England as a scientific publisher were also recognized by the University of Oxford, which in 1979 appointed him Master of Arts hc, just as he was elected as a fellow of both St. Cross and Green College sst.
In Denmark he was a board member of Hans Reitzel's publishing house 1984-92 and of Høst & søns publishing house 1986-92.
His professional skill, his personal charm and a unique ability to make connections with scientists and publishers around the world brought Per Saugman to the forefront. The art - especially English watercolor painting - was of great interest to him; it came in handy when he founded the Sunningwell School of Arts in Oxford in 1972, which he later turned into a self-governing institution.
Family
Per Saugman was born in Kirke Stillinge, Hejninge sg., And died in Helsingør.
F: Chief Physician, later General Practitioner Emanuel Andreas Gotfred Saugman (1878–1962) and Esther Lehmann (1887-1986). Married 28.12.1950 in Bristol, England, to Secretary Patricia Doreen Fulford, born 10.3.1929 in Bristol, died 2004, d. By Director William Henry F. (born 1898) and Ivy Heale (born 1902).
Per Saugman's memoirs: Something with books, 1995. Life story in the order chapter.

https://biografiskleksikon.lex.dk/Per_Saugman

Bibliography 
 From the first fifty years : an informal history of Blackwell Scientific Publications, 1989-1992

External links
 http://books.guardian.co.uk/obituaries/story/0,,1682891,00.html 
 https://www.independent.co.uk/news/obituaries/per-saugman-6112594.html

Book publishers (people)
20th-century Danish publishers (people)
British book publishers (people)
Fellows of St Cross College, Oxford
1925 births
2005 deaths
Danish expatriates in the United Kingdom